Charlie is the third studio album by American singer Charlie Puth, released on October 7, 2022 by Atlantic Records. It is Puth's first album in four years, after Voicenotes (2018), with Puth calling it is his most personal album to date. After deciding to scrap his progress of the original version of the album in 2020 due to poor performances and reviews of the singles he released, Puth took a moment to "recalibrate", and became inspired to tease the makings of the songs he was making, causing him to tease nearly the entire album on TikTok, which made several of the songs go viral on the app. Charlie was preceded by six singles: "Light Switch", "That's Hilarious", "Left and Right" featuring Jungkook of BTS, "Smells Like Me", "I Don't Think That I Like Her", "Charlie Be Quiet!" and "Loser"

Background 
Charlie Puth's second studio album Voicenotes, was released on May 11, 2018, by Artist Partner Group and Atlantic Records. The album received positive reviews from critics and was commercially successful, peaking at number four on the Billboard 200, and was certified Gold by the RIAA for selling 500,000 units in the United States. The album was supported by the Voicenotes Tour in July 2018, and was nominated for a Grammy Award.

Between 2019 and 2021, Puth released and was featured on a handful of singles. He dropped three standalone singles that were meant for the album in 2019; "I Warned Myself", "Mother", and "Cheating on You". He dropped two more standalone singles in 2020; "Girlfriend", and "Hard on Yourself", the latter featuring Blackbear. He also released "Free" as a single from the 2020 film The One and Only Ivan. Puth featured in "Summer Feelings" with Lennon Stella for the soundtrack for the 2020 film Scoob!, and featured on singles with JVKE, Sasha Alex Sloan, and Elton John. He also appeared on the remix of Gabby Barrett's single "I Hope", which helped the song peak at number three on the Billboard Hot 100, becoming Puth's fourth top ten hit.

Promotion

Tour 
On September 16, 2022, Puth announced that he would be embarking on the One Night Only Tour in support of Charlie. The tour will visit North America in October and November 2022, with tickets being available for sale on September 23, 2022. On September 26, 2022, Puth announced he would be bringing the tour to Europe with tickets going on sale on September 30, 2022.

Singles 
Charlie was supported by six singles. Its lead single, "Light Switch", was released on January 20, 2022. It went viral on TikTok months prior to its release. The song peaked at 27 on the Billboard Hot 100, and charted internationally in Canada, Ireland, Lithuania, New Zealand, Singapore, Sweden, Switzerland, United Kingdom, and also charted globally.

"That's Hilarious" was released as the album's second single on April 8, 2022. The song failed to chart in the US, peaking at nine on Bubbling Under Hot 100. However, the song peaked at 80 in Canada, and at 100 in the United Kingdom.

"Left and Right", which features BTS member Jungkook, was released on June 24, 2022 as the third single from the album. The song peaked at 22 in the United States, becoming the album's highest charting song there, and peaked at 17 in Canada, while also charting in 29 additional countries.

"Smells Like Me" was released as the fourth single on September 2, 2022, followed by the fifth single, "I Don't Think That I Like Her", on September 16, 2022, the sixth single, "Charlie Be Quiet!", on September 30, 2022,and the seventh single, "Loser", on October 7, 2022.

Critical reception

At Metacritic, which assigns a normalized rating out of 100 to reviews from professional publications, Charlie received a weighted average score of 81, indicating "universal acclaim", based on five critical reviews. It is Puth's highest-rated album on the site.

Commercial performance
Charlie debuted at number 10 on the US Billboard 200 chart with 26,500 album equivalent units, 9,500 of which came from pure sales. It earned Puth his third top-ten album in the United States. The album debuted at number 9 on the UK Albums Chart, earning Puth his third top-ten album in the country.

Track listing

Personnel
Musicians
 Charlie Puth – vocals
 Jan Ozveren – guitar
 David Bukovinszky – cello (track 1)
 Mattias Bylund – string arrangement, string synthesizer (1, 8)
 Mattias Johansson – violin (1, 8)
 Conny Lindgren – violin (1)
 Travis Barker – drums (11)

Technical
 Charlie Puth – production, mixing
 Colin Leonard – mastering (1, 3)
 Emerson Mancini – mastering (2, 4–12)
 Manny Marroquin – mixing
 Chris Galland – mix engineering (1, 5, 6)
 Benjamin Sedano – engineering
 Pdogg – engineering (6)
 Mattias Bylund – recording (1)
 Jeremie Inhaber – mixing assistance (1, 6)
 Scott Desmarais – mixing assistance (1, 6)
 Robin Florent – mixing assistance (1, 6)
 Trey Station – mixing assistance (2–4, 7–12)
 Anthony Vilchis – mixing assistance (2–4, 7–12)
 Zach Pereyra – mixing assistance (2–4, 7–12)

Charts

References 

2022 albums
Atlantic Records albums
Charlie Puth albums